Finland competed at the 1976 Summer Olympics in Montreal, Quebec, Canada. 83 competitors, 77 men and 6 women, took part in 63 events in 14 sports.

Medalists

Gold
 Lasse Virén — Athletics, Men's 5,000m
 Lasse Virén — Athletics, Men's 10,000m
 Pertti Karppinen — Rowing, Men's Single Sculls 
 Pertti Ukkola — Wrestling, Men's Greco-Roman Bantamweight

Silver
 Antti Kalliomäki — Athletics, Men's Pole Vault 
 Hannu Siitonen — Athletics, Men's Javelin Throw

Archery

In the nation's second appearance in archery competition at the Olympics, Finland entered two men.  Defending bronze medallist Kyösti Laasonen competed again, this time placing 15th.

Men's Individual Competition:
 Kyösti Laasonen — 2379 points (→ 15th place)
 Kauko Laasonen — 2348 points (→ 20th place)

Athletics

Men's 800 metres
 Markku Taskinen
 Heat — did not start (→ did not advance)

Men's 5.000 metres
 Lasse Virén
 Heat — 13:33.39
 Final — 13:24.76 (→  Gold Medal)
 Lasse Orimus
 Heat — 13:23.43 (→ did not advance)

Men's 10.000 metres
 Lasse Virén
 Heat — 28:14.95
 Final — 27:40.38 (→  Gold Medal)
 Martti Vainio
 Heat — 28:26.60 (→ did not advance)
 Pekka Paivarinta
 Heat — did not finish (→ did not advance)

Men's 4 × 400 m Relay 
 Ossi Karttunen, Markku Kukkoaho, Stig Lönnqvist, and Hannu Mäkelä
 Heat — 3:05.02 
 Final — 3:06.51 (→ 8th place)

Men's Marathon
 Lasse Virén — 2:13:10 (→ 5th place)
 Håkan Spik — 2:17:50 (→ 16th place)
 Jukka Toivola — 2:20:26 (→ 27th place)

Men's Discus Throw
 Pentti Kahma
 Qualification — 62.10m
 Final — 63.12m (→ 6th place)
 Markku Tuokko
 Qualification — 59.80m (→ did not advance)

Boxing

Canoeing

Cycling

One cyclist represented Finland in 1976.

Individual road race
 Harry Hannus — 4:49:01 (→ 20th place)

Individual pursuit
 Harry Hannus — 13th place

Fencing

Four fencers, all men, represented Finland in 1976.

Men's épée
 Veikko Salminen

Men's team épée
 Heikki Hulkkonen
 Risto Hurme
 Jussi Pelli
 Veikko Salminen

Judo

Modern pentathlon

Three male pentathletes represented Finland in 1976.

Individual
 Risto Hurme
 Jussi Pelli
 Heikki Hulkkonen

Team
 Risto Hurme
 Jussi Pelli
 Heikki Hulkkonen

Rowing

Sailing

Shooting

Swimming

Weightlifting

Wrestling

See also
 Finland at the 1976 Summer Paralympics

References

Nations at the 1976 Summer Olympics
1976 Summer Olympics
S